In optimization, a descent direction is a vector  that points towards a local minimum  of an objective function .

Computing  by an iterative method, such as line search defines a descent direction  at the th iterate to be any  such that , where  denotes the inner product. The motivation for such an approach is that small steps along  guarantee that  is reduced, by Taylor's theorem.

Using this definition, the negative of a non-zero gradient is always a

Numerous methods exist to compute descent directions, all with differing merits, such as gradient descent or the conjugate gradient method.

More generally, if  is a positive definite matrix, then
This generality is used in preconditioned gradient descent methods.

See also 
 Directional derivative

References 

Mathematical optimization